The Red Grass was a British black-and-white science fiction children's television series (6 Jan – 10 Feb 1959) about waving red grass that seeds itself all over the world and is fatal to the touch.

A group of ordinary young people with no special expertise or knowledge struggle to understand the Red Grass, where it came from, what its purpose is on Earth, and how to combat its spread and wipe it out before it kills the last human beings to survive.

Reception
Nigel Planer, who watched the serial as a child, described it as "terrifying!", although no contemporary tabloid reviews appear to have survived.

Archive status
No recordings of any of the six episodes are known to exist, presumably having been wiped or misplaced. The serial is effectively lost.

External links
The Red Grass at For the Children: Children's Television in the UK

1950s British children's television series
1950s British science fiction television series
Black-and-white British television shows
British children's science fiction television series
ITV children's television shows